Jean Guéhenno born Marcel-Jules-Marie Guéhenno (25 March 1890 – 22 September 1978) was a French essayist, writer and literary critic.

Life and career 
Jean Guéhenno, writer and educator, was a prominent contributor to the NRF. He was editor-in-chief of the literary journal Europe from 1929 until May 1936. Guéhenno wrote one novel, The Dead Youth, based on his memories of World War I.

During the Nazi occupation of France, Guéhenno refused to publish, believing to do so would be collaboration.  Instead, he kept a secret journal, chronicling the infringement by the Vichy government of traditional French rights and values, and his own efforts on behalf of the Resistance. This was published in France in 1947.

The first English translation of the journal, by David Ball, was published in 2014 under the title Diary of the Dark Years, 1940–1944.

According to the translator's introduction, it is "the book French readers have turned to most readily for an account of life under German occupation."  The Wall Street Journal featured it "as the top entry in its list of the Five Best books on the French Resistance."

Jean Guéhenno was elected to the Académie française on 25 January 1962.

Notes

External links 
 

1890 births
1978 deaths
People from Fougères
French literary critics
Lycée Lakanal teachers
French male essayists
20th-century French essayists
20th-century French male writers
Lycée Louis-le-Grand teachers